Deiphobe is an Asian genus of praying mantids: in the family Rivetinidae.

Species
The Mantodea Species File lists:
Deiphobe australiana Giglio-Tos, 1916
Deiphobe brevipennis Sjostedt, 1930
Deiphobe brunneri Saussure, 1871
Deiphobe infuscata Saussure, 1870
Deiphobe longipes Werner, 1926
Deiphobe mesomelas Olivier, 1792 (synonyms D. incisa, D. robusta, D. yunnanensis)
Deiphobe moseri (Saussure, 1871)
Deiphobe xanthoptera (Olivier, 1792)

References

External links

Mantodea genera